Victoria Anne Williams (born 15 May 1995) is an English badminton player. She studied Psychology at the Loughborough University.

Achievements

BWF International Challenge/Series(6 titles, 7 runners-up) 
Women's doubles

Mixed doubles

  BWF International Challenge tournament
  BWF International Series tournament
  BWF Future Series tournament

References

External links 
 

1995 births
Living people
People from Frimley
English female badminton players